Pahlavi High School (Persian: دبیرستان پهلوی, dabirestan-e pahlavi), also known as Imam Khomeini High School, is a large historical school and tourist attraction in Borujerd, western Iran. Completed in 1936, the high school was one of the earliest modern schools built under Iranian king Reza Shah during Pahlavi dynasty. The monument was nationally registered as a protected historical site in 2008.

Pahlavi High School is located in South Hafez Street. The school was constructed in a garrison land of 14000 square meters. Several buildings and schools have been added to this area in later dates. 

The main building is made in three floors including a basement. Classes are distributed in ground floor and first floor. Each class opens in an indoor hall and outdoor balcony. The exterior design of the building is covered by bricks and the building has a shape similar to H. Two balconies are visible at the southern angle of the building. The high school has a gathering hall and laboratory.

Architect
The original plan of Pahlavi School was provided by French architect Maxime Siroux but it was performed by Iranian architects and engineers.

Gallery

Borujerd